Kormac Sidney Valdebenito Gómez (born 1 February 1982) is a Chilean former football player who played as a midfielder.

Club career
Born in Valdivia, Valdebenito came to Universidad Católica youth system in 1995, after being watched by Jorge Alvial, a football agent, in a championship in his city of birth called Mundialito (Little World Cup), joining the first team thanks to coach Juvenal Olmos in 2001, with whom he won the Chilean Primera División title in 2002 Apertura. 

In Chile he also played for Deportes Melipilla, Deportes Puerto Montt and Unión Española.

Abroad he played for USL First Division clubs Virginia Beach Mariners and Puerto Rico Islanders, where he was recommended by Jorge Alvial.

International career
He represented Chile at under-17 level in the 1999 South American Championship.

Post-retirement

He works as a football agent, having been the representative of players such as Felipe Jaramillo, Jean Beausejour, Marco Estrada, Carlos Carmona, among others. 

In 2010, he also worked as Sport Manager of Sportverein Jugendland Fussball from Peñaflor in the Chilean Tercera B, with Eduardo Bonvallet as coach.

Honours
Universidad Católica
 Chilean Primera División: 2002 Apertura

Deportes Melipilla
 Primera B de Chile: 2004

References

External links
 
 
 Kormac Valdebenito at PlaymakerStats

1982 births
Living people
People from Valdivia
Chilean footballers
Chilean expatriate footballers
Chile youth international footballers
Club Deportivo Universidad Católica footballers
Deportes Melipilla footballers
Puerto Montt footballers
Virginia Beach Mariners players
Puerto Rico Islanders players
Unión Española footballers
Chilean Primera División players
Primera B de Chile players
USL First Division players
Chilean expatriate sportspeople in the United States
Chilean expatriate sportspeople in Puerto Rico
Expatriate soccer players in the United States
Expatriate footballers in Puerto Rico
Association football midfielders
Chilean football managers